József Maróthy (15 October 1887 – 20 October 1955) was a Hungarian wrestler. He competed in the men's Greco-Roman lightweight at the 1908 Summer Olympics.

References

1887 births
1955 deaths
Hungarian male sport wrestlers
Olympic wrestlers of Hungary
Wrestlers at the 1908 Summer Olympics
Sportspeople from Szeged
20th-century Hungarian people